Leucophyllum frutescens is an evergreen shrub in the figwort family, Scrophulariaceae, native to the U.S. state of Texas, where it is the official "State Native Shrub of Texas", and to the states of Coahuila, Nuevo León, and Tamaulipas in northern Mexico. Although commonly known as Texas sage, it is not a true sage and is distinct from the genus Salvia. The species is also called Texas Ranger, Texas rain sage, cenizo, Texas silverleaf, Texas barometerbush, ash-bush, wild lilac, purple sage, senisa, cenicilla, palo cenizo, or hierba del cenizo.

The solitary axillary flowers are bell- or funnel-shaped, with five lobes and two lips. This species is found in rocky, calcareous soils.

Cultivation
Texas sage is a popular ornamental plant, commonly used for edge and area plantings in warmer and drier areas; it requires minimal water, is easily shaped into hedges, and blooms over the entire surface. It is available in a variety of cultivars, including 'Green Cloud', 'White Cloud', 'Compacta', 'Convent', and 'Bert-Star'.

Ecology
L. frutescens is a host plant for the caterpillars of the theona checkerspot (Chlosyne theona) and calleta silkmoth
(Eupackardia calleta).

References

frutescens
Flora of Texas
Flora of Northeastern Mexico
Flora of Coahuila
Flora of Nuevo León
Flora of Tamaulipas
Plants described in 1924
Garden plants of North America
Drought-tolerant plants
Symbols of Texas